Ostell Shawn Miles (born August 6, 1970) is a former American football running back who played two seasons with the Cincinnati Bengals of the National Football League. He was drafted by the Cincinnati Bengals in the ninth round of the 1992 NFL Draft. He first enrolled at Pasadena City College before transferring to the University of Houston. Miles attended George Washington High School in Denver, Colorado.

References

External links
Just Sports Stats
College stats

Living people
1970 births
Players of American football from Denver
American football running backs
African-American players of American football
Pasadena City Lancers football players
Houston Cougars football players
Cincinnati Bengals players
21st-century African-American sportspeople
20th-century African-American sportspeople